Michael Potter (born 1963) is an Australian rugby league coach and former player.

Michael or Mike Potter may also refer to:
 Michael Potter (entrepreneur), entrepreneur, documentary filmmaker and author
 Michael Potter (cyclist) (born 1997), Australian cyclist
 Michael Potter (immunologist) (1924–2013), American physician and immunologist
Michael Potter (minister), covenanter
 Mike Potter (racing driver) (born 1949), American racecar driver
 Mike Potter (baseball) (born 1951), American baseball outfielder
 Michael Cressé Potter (1858–1948), English botanist, herbarium curator, and Anglican priest